In mathematics, a eutactic lattice (or eutactic form) is a lattice in Euclidean space whose minimal vectors form a eutactic star. This means they have a set of positive eutactic coefficients ci such that (v, v) = Σci(v, mi)2 where the sum is over the minimal vectors  mi.  "Eutactic" is derived from the Greek language, and means "well-situated" or "well-arranged".

 proved that a lattice is extreme if and only if it is both perfect and eutactic.

 summarize the properties of eutactic lattices of dimension up to 7.

References

Quadratic forms